KGDD (1150 AM) is a radio station licensed to Portland, Oregon, United States. It serves the Portland area. The station is currently owned by Bustos Media of Oregon License, LLC. The station currently has a construction permit from the FCC to increase their daytime power to 10,000 watts and nighttime to 63 watts.

History
From July 4, 1954 when the station first signed on with the call letters KHFS until 1956, then KKEY was owned by the Weagant family of Vancouver, WA. After trying several different formats throughout the 1950s and '60s, in 1971 KKEY went all talk with such hosts as Jack Hurd, Alan Hirsch, Peter Marland Jones, Jerry Dimmitt, and Rick Miller. Originally a daytime only station, KKEY was granted nighttime authorization in 1988 to operate at 47 watts. KKEY remained with primarily a talk format until the station was sold in 1998. It temporarily went off the air before signing back on as KKGT, again an all-talk station.

The station was assigned the KLPM call sign by the Federal Communications Commission on April 14, 2009.

On January 21, 2011 KLPM changed their format to Spanish hits, branded as "Exitos 93.5", which also rebroadcasts on FM translator K228EU 93.5 FM. On January 25, 2011, KLPM changed their call letters to KXET to go with the "Exitos 93.5" branding.

In June 2011, Adelante Media sold KXET and three Portland, Oregon, area sister stations to Bustos Media (through its license-holding subsidiary Bustos Media Holdings, LLC) for a combined sale price of $1,260,000. The FCC approved the transfer on August 16, 2011, and the deal was formally consummated on September 30, 2011.

During the weekend of August 13–14, 2011, KXET was taken off the air by theft of equipment in its transmitter site, however, their transmissions are still available on FM via K228EU.

It returned to the air on June 8, 2012 with a 100-watt transmitter. It has received special temporary authority to transmit with 1,000 watts until a 5,000-watt transmitter is installed.

On November 17, 2012, KXET changed their format to Russian Christian, simulcasting KQRR 1130 AM Mount Angel, Oregon.

On February 5, 2015, KXET changed their call letters to KGDD and changed their format to regional Mexican, branded as "La Gran D", swapping formats with KGDD 1520 AM Oregon City, OR.

References

External links

FCC special temporary authority to operate with a 1,000 watt transmitter
FCC History Cards for KGDD

GDD
Radio stations established in 1954
1954 establishments in Oregon